Johnny on the Run is a 1953 adventure film directed by Lewis Gilbert. It was produced by the Children's Film Foundation

It includes documentary footage of streets in the south side of Edinburgh in the early 1950s and of rural Perthshire.

Plot
In Edinburgh, young Polish boy Janek/Johnny lives with his aunt and cousins. He feels an outcast in the home. One day when he is out pushing his baby cousin in a pram a group of boys start to taunt him about being Polish and a fight begins, during which the pram rolls off. Janek chases after it with a growing crowd chasing. He catches the pram at the head of a flight of steps. His aunt materialises and calls him a wicked boy. The crowd mills behind her. Janek is scared and runs off through the alleys. He ends on Princes Street and sees a poster for trips to his homeland of Poland in a travel agent. He goes in and is told the cheapest way to travel is a ship from Dundee to Danzig which costs £17.

He sneaks into the back of a removal lorry labelled Dundee. Arriving at night he encounters two thieves trying to break into a house. They tell him that they have lost their key and get him to climb in the fanlight to unlock the door. They get him to wait in the hall while they steal a brooch from a safe. The phone rings and they are startled. They run off just as a policeman arrives. The men split and one takes Janek. They get a lift north in the back of a lorry but start to fight and fall out.

In the middle of the night they go to a remote cottage where an old man lets them sleep on his floor. Janek runs off while they sleep going further north. He shelters in ruined castle and the next day a group of children find him and take him to their special school in Perthshire. The children call him Johnny.

The headmaster takes his photo and he appears in the newspaper which asks "do you know this boy"

Back in Edinburgh the police see the photo and ask his aunt why she never reported the boy as missing. The crooks also see the newspaper and head north to find Janek because they hid the brooch in his jacket. They find the school and search for the brooch in the school safe.

Meanwhile Janek heads a paper chase cross country run. The police arrive and interview the headmaster. The girls (who are not part of the paper chase) explore the lockers and find the brooch. A little black girl decides to wear it as Janek likes her.

The crooks join the cross country race and catch Janek in a church with one of the girls who has the brooch. Janek rings the church bell and everyone including the police arrive.

His aunt comes but Janek says he wants to say at the school.

Cast
Eugeniusz Chylek as Janek (Johnny)
Sydney Tafler as 'Flash Harry' Fisher
Michael Balfour as 'Fingers' Brown
Jean Anderson as Mrs. MacIntyre
Moultrie Kelsall as Mr. MacIntyre
Mona Washbourne as Mrs. MacGregor
Margaret McCourt as Janet MacGregor
Keith Faulkner as Kenneth MacGregor
Cleo Sylvestre (Cleopatra Sylvestre) as Susie
John Laurie as the Edinburgh policeman

Critical reception
TV Guide gave the film three out of five stars, and wrote, "This well-paced film is particularly strong in its realistic depiction of children"; and Nothing But The Night wrote, "With its beautifully photographed images of Edinburgh’s Old Town and some utterly beguiling landscape shots of the main Highland settings which were filmed around Loch Earn, this is perhaps one of the CFF’s classiest looking titles, bolstered by fine art direction from Hammer’s Bernard Robinson and a lyrical orchestral score by Antony Hopkins."

References

External links

1953 films
Films directed by Lewis Gilbert
British black-and-white films
1953 adventure films
British adventure films
Films scored by Antony Hopkins
1950s English-language films
1950s British films